ADAMA Ltd. (Hebrew: אדמה בע"מ ; Chinese: 安道麦), formerly known as Makhteshim-Agan, is a crop protection company.

Overview
Together with its wholly owned subsidiary, Adama Agricultural Solutions Ltd., ADAMA manufacturers and retails herbicides, insecticides and fungicides. The company has research and development (R&D) and manufacturing facilities in various locations worldwide, with two main centers in Israel and China. It is traded on the Shenzhen Stock Exchange and is headquartered in Ashdod City, Israel. In 2017, Adama Agricultural Solutions Ltd. was acquired by Hubei Sanonda Co. Ltd., a Chinese agro-chemical producer and partially owned subsidiary of ChemChina.

History

Agan was founded in 1949 as a cooperative, while Makhteshim was created in 1952. In 1973, Agan and Makhteshim partnered to distribute their products and 24 years later merged to form Makhteshim Agan Industries Ltd. In October 2011, ChemChina acquired a 60% stake in Makhteshim Agan, delisting from the Tel Aviv Stock Exchange. In 2014, the company changed its name to Adama.

In June 2017, the China Securities Regulatory Commission approved the acquisition of the remaining 40% of shares by ChemChina, making it the sole owner of the company through its Hubei Sandona Co. Ltd. subsidiary. Since August 2017, ADAMA has traded on the Shenzhen Stock Exchange and in January 2018, was included in the Shenzhen-Hong Kong Stock Connect.

Sales and operations
ADAMA sells its products in approximately 100 countries through 60 subsidiary companies around the world. In 2019, ADAMA reported sales of $3.997 billion, EBITDA of $656 million, a net income of $208 million and operating income of $410 million.

ADAMA has chemical synthesis production facilities in Israel, China and Brazil; formulation facilities in Israel, China, India, Europe, North America and South America; and R&D facilities in Israel, China and India.

References

External links
ADAMA website

Chemical companies of Israel
Agriculture companies of Israel
Multinational companies
1945 establishments
Manufacturing companies based in Tel Aviv
ChemChina